Vimy ( or ; ; Dutch: Wimi) is a commune in the Pas-de-Calais department in the Hauts-de-France region of France. The Memorial is also the site of two Canadian cemeteries.

Geography and history
It is situated on the crest of Vimy Ridge, a prominent feature overlooking the Artois region.

The town was first mentioned in 1183 as Viniarcum and was the scene of much fighting during the fourteenth, seventeenth and eighteenth centuries among the French, English, Dutch and Spanish forces.

The ridge was the scene of fierce fighting in the First World War. Seized by the Germans in 1914, it was the subject of a French assault in 1915. In 1917 the Battle of Vimy Ridge took place southeast of Vimy and was an important battle of the war for Canadian military history. The town was practically destroyed during the fighting in the area.

Places of interest

Canadian National Vimy Memorial Park

Set on the highest point of Vimy Ridge, the Canadian National Vimy Memorial is the largest of Canada's war monuments. In 1922, use of the land for the battlefield park which contains the memorial was granted, in perpetuity, by the French nation to the people of Canada in recognition of Canada's war efforts.  of the former Vimy Ridge battlefield is preserved as part of the memorial park which surrounds the monument. The grounds of the site are still honeycombed with wartime tunnels, trenches and craters, closed off for public safety.

The project took designer Walter Seymour Allward 11 years to see built. (The total cost was $1.5 million, which is over $20 million in present terms.) King Edward VIII unveiled it on 26 July 1936 in the presence of French President Albert Lebrun and a crowd of over 50,000 including over 6200 Canadian veterans and their families.

Following an extensive multi-year restoration, Queen Elizabeth II re-dedicated the monument on 9 April 2007 at a ceremony commemorating the 90th anniversary of the battle. A new $10 million visitor center was completed before the 9 April 2017 commemoration of the 100th anniversary of the battle. The event was anticipated to be attended by as many as 30,000 people. 
The official ceremony included comments by Canadian Prime Minister Justin Trudeau, Governor General David Johnston as representative of the Monarchy of Canada, Prince Charles as representative of the Monarchy of the United Kingdom, Prince William, Duke of Cambridge, Prince Harry, the President of France François Hollande, and the Prime Minister of France Bernard Cazeneuve.

Town of Vimy
 The church of St.Martin, rebuilt, along with much of the village, after World War I.
 The remains of a thirteenth-century castle, destroyed in 1833, now the site of the current town hall.

Population

Twin towns
Horley in Surrey, England.
Fischach in Bavaria, Germany.

See also
Communes of the Pas-de-Calais department

References

Communes of Pas-de-Calais
Artois